The 2014 Honda Indy 200 at Mid-Ohio was the fifteenth round to the 2014 IndyCar Series season. Scott Dixon won the race, giving him his fifth Mid-Ohio win in eight seasons.

References

Honda Indy 200
Indy 200 at Mid-Ohio
Honda Indy 200 at Mid-Ohio